Sotai Xinyi, also known as Landmark Mansion, is a 34-story,  mixed-use skyscraper building completed in 2018 and located in Daan District, Taipei, Taiwan. Designed by the P&T Group, the 3rd to 18th floors of the building are used for office spaces, whilst the 19th to 34th floors are residential apartment units. The basement of the building is connected with Xinyi Anhe metro station.

See also 
 List of tallest buildings in Taiwan
 List of tallest buildings in Taipei
 Xinyi Anhe metro station
 Cloud Top
 55 Timeless
 Tao Zhu Yin Yuan

External links 
Sotai Xinyi Official Page

References

2018 establishments in Taiwan
Skyscraper office buildings in Taipei
Office buildings completed in 2018
Residential skyscrapers in Taiwan
Residential buildings completed in 2018
Apartment buildings in Taiwan